Mama Oqllu (also spelled as Oclo, Ocllo, Uqllu, Ogllo) is a central figure in Inca creation myth. She is identified as one of the original founders of the Inca people and is credited with helping discover and settle the Inca capital of Cuzco in highland Peru.

Her name means "shapely [plump] mother.". Mama Oqllu was worshipped as a maternal figure and fertility goddess. She taught women how to weave cloth and build houses. While her existence itself is not supported by physical evidence, her son Sinchi Roca has definitive archaeological evidence to indicate he was a living person.

Origin 
The creator god in Incan culture, Viracocha, or in some versions, the sun god Inti, tasked eight Incas with finding, "fertile lands that they coveted to make them rich,". Viracocha summoned them from the cave Qhapaq Toqo (Rich Window), then calling the Maras and Tambos people from their nearby caves called Maras Toqo and Sutiq Toqo. After the eight Incas were called forward, they paired off as husbands and wives.

Family Layout
Mama Oqllu has three sisters: Mama Waku, Mama Ipakura, and Mama Rawa. The sisters paired off with their four brothers: Ayar Manqo, Ayar Awka, Ayar Kachi, and Ayar Uchu. Mama Oqllu married her brother Ayar Manqo (known as Manqo Qhapaq). While on their journey to settle rich lands, Mama Oqllu gave birth to her son Sinchi Roca, the first ruler of Inca culture, at the site of Tamboquiro. The eight were revered as "intermediaries between the creator god and the humans, charged with a mission of civilizing the earth and organizing its people into a community."

The Journey
Manqo Qhapaq and Mama Oqllu were viewed as the "principal couple." The couple were able to rally the Tambos as an ally to the Incas. Qhapaq and Oqllu organized the Tambos into kin groups, called ayllu. The pair continued to seek out a land capable of plentifully supporting them and the Tambos people. However, Ayar Kachi caused problems, ultimately leading to him being trapped inside a cave.

Eventually the couple found a mountain top in which they could look down into the valley of future Cuzco. After the mythical golden rod test succeeded, Cuzco was determined to be their home.

References

Inca mythology